The 2004 USL A-League was an American Division II league run by the United Soccer League during the summer of 2004.

Standings

Western Conference

Eastern Conference

Playoffs

Eastern Conference

Richmond Kickers vs Syracuse Salty Dogs

The Syracuse Salty Dogs advance, 5–4, on penalty kicks after the series ended tied 2–2 on aggregate.

Rochester Rhinos vs Montreal Impact

The Montreal Impact advance 2–0 on aggregate.

Western Conference semifinals

Portland Timbers vs Seattle Sounders

The Seattle Sounders advance 3–2 on aggregate.

Vancouver Whitecaps vs Minnesota Thunder

The Vancouver Whitecaps advance 3–0 on aggregate.

Eastern Conference final

The Montreal Impact advanced 3–1 on aggregate.

Western Conference finals

The Seattle Sounders advance 2–1 on aggregate.

Final

MVP: Mauricio Vincello

Points leaders

Awards and All A-League Teams
All A-League First Team 
F: Byron Alvarez (Portland Timbers); Alan Gordon (Portland Timbers) (Co-Leading Goalscorer); Dante Washington (Virginia Beach Mariners) (Co-Leading Goalscorer)
M: Mauro Biello (Montreal Impact); Sandro Grande (Montreal Impact); Alex Pineda Chacón (Atlanta Silverbacks); Johnny Torres (Milwaukee Wave United)
D: Gabriel Gervais (Montreal Impact) (Defender of the Year);  Dustin Branan (Minnesota Thunder); Peter Luzak (Richmond Kickers)
G: Greg Sutton (Montreal Impact) (MVP & Goalkeeper of the Year)
Coach: Bobby Howe Portland Timbers) (Coach of the Year)

All A-League Second Team
F: Mac Cozier (Atlanta Silverbacks); Ali Gerba (Toronto Lynx); Greg Howes (Milwaukee Wave United)
M: Hugo Alcaraz-Cuellar Portland Timbers); Justin Evans (Charleston Battery); Alfredo Valente (Vancouver Whitecaps); Richie Williams (Richmond Kickers)
D: Craig Demmin (Rochester Raging Rhinos); Nevio Pizzolitto (Montreal Impact); Mark Watson (Charleston Battery)
G: Joe Warren (Minnesota Thunder)

References

External links
 United Soccer Leagues (RSSSF)

1
2
2004